= Ioniapolis =

Town of ancient Caria - Hellenistic period

Coordinates: 37°28′29″N 27°30′30″E

Ioniapolis (Ancient Greek: Ἰωνίαπολις) was a town of ancient Caria that flourished during the Hellenistic period.

Its site is located near Mersinet Iskelesi, Muğla Province, Turkey.
